Eclipse is a brand for a line of DVD film series released by The Criterion Collection. It debuted on March 27, 2007. 
The brand was created to produce budget-priced, high-quality DVD editions of hard-to-find films. The DVDs are released in boxed sets that have contained between two and seven films, and focus on a specific director, film studio, genre, or theme.  Typically, they are released monthly. In order to keep prices low, the films do not receive the same degree of remastering or any of the special features generally associated with Criterion Collection titles. When Criterion announced that all of their future releases would be in dual format (DVD + Blu-ray) they specifically said that Eclipse was meant to be available in a cheaper form and thus would continue to be on DVD only.

History
Eclipse was conceived of as a possible subsidiary label for cult films.

Mission statement

Peter Becker, in his blog On Five from The Criterion Collection Web site, explained, "We want [important, hard to find films] to be more readily available, and that’s why we’re creating Eclipse. Each month we’ll present a short series, usually three to five films, focusing on a particular director or theme. There will be no supplements and the master materials will be the best we can find, but they won’t be full Criterion restorations."

Pricing
From Peter Becker's blog: "Retail pricing for each set will average under $15 per disc, and we are examining the logistics of making the sets available at an even more favorable rate on a subscriber or club basis. The goal here is to make these films available, to make sure that Criterion’s own work style doesn’t contribute to the continuing unavailability of these films." Because these are multiple disc box sets, the total suggested retail price depends on the set. The Documentaries of Louis Malle, for example, is six discs, and it has a suggested retail price of $79.99.

Eclipse boxed sets

See also
 List of Criterion Collection releases

References

External links
 Official Web Site
 Initial Press Release

DVD companies of the United States
Home video lines
The Criterion Collection